Gaetano De Andrea, C.R. (1630–1702) was a Roman Catholic prelate who served as Bishop of Monopoli (1698–1702).

Biography
Gaetano De Andrea was born on 14 September 1630 in Ravello, Italy and ordained a priest in the Congregation of Clerics Regular of the Divine Providence.
On 15 September 1698, he was appointed during the papacy of Pope Innocent XII as Bishop of Monopoli.
On 21 September 1698, he was consecrated bishop by Pier Matteo Petrucci, Cardinal-Priest of San Marcello al Corso, with Francesco Pannocchieschi d'Elci, Archbishop of Pisa, and Domenico Belisario de Bellis, Bishop of Molfetta, serving as co-consecrators. 
He served as Bishop of Monopoli until his death in January 1702.

References

External links and additional sources
 (for Chronology of Bishops) 
 (for Chronology of Bishops) 

17th-century Italian Roman Catholic bishops
Bishops appointed by Pope Innocent XII
Bishops of Monopoli
1630 births
1702 deaths